Sultan Al Ameemi (born 1974) is an Emirati writer. He was born in Al Dhaid in the UAE. He has published more than a dozen books, including short story collections, novels, and works of non-fiction. In 2014, he took part in the IPAF Nadwa workshop, where he began work on a novel titled One Room Is Not Enough. The novel was eventually nominated for the Arabic Booker Prize.

He writes a weekly culture column in the Al-Emarat Al-Youm newspaper.

References

Emirati writers